Samson is a Biblical figure known for his superhuman strength, derived from his hair.

Samson may also refer to:

Arts and entertainment

Fictional characters
 the title character of Samson Agonistes, a 1671 closet drama by John Milton based on the biblical story 
 Samson, character from Need for Speed: Carbon

Films and television
 Samson, a lion character in the 2006 Disney animated film The Wild
 Samson Clogmeyer, from the Cartoon Network series Camp Lazlo
 Brock Samson, from the animated series The Venture Bros
 Samson the bear, from Sesamstraße, the German-language version of children's show Sesame Street
 Edgar "Samson" Leonhardt, from the American TV series Carnivàle
 one of the title characters of the Hanna-Barbera cartoon Samson & Goliath
 a talking dog in the  Belgian children's show Samson en Gert
 a character from the British children's series Thomas & Friends
 a character from the comedy film Half Baked

Comics
 Samson (Fox Feature Syndicate), a Golden Age character
 Black Samson, one of the Guardians of the Globe from Invincible
 Doc Samson, a Marvel superhero 
 Mighty Samson, a Gold Key Comics character
 Samson, a member of the Marvel Comics team the Morlocks

Plays and films 
 Samson (play), a 1908 play by the French writer Henri Bernstein, basis of the 1915, 1923 and 1936 films below
 Samson (1914 film), an American short
 Samson (1915 film), an American production
 Samson (1923 film), an Italian movie
 Samson (1936 film), a French film directed by Maurice Tourneur
 Samson (1961 Polish film), directed by Andrzej Wajda
 Samson (1961 Italian film), by Gianfranco Parolini
 Samson (2018 film), an American film by Bruce Macdonald

Music 
 Samson (Handel), an oratorio by George Frideric Handel
 Samson (opera), a 1734 lost opera Jean-Philippe Rameau, libretto by Voltaire
 Samson (band), a British hard rock band, formed in 1977 by guitarist and vocalist Paul Samson

Songs
 "Samson" (Emly Starr song), Belgian entry in the Eurovision Song Contest, 1981
 "Samson" (Regina Spektor song), 2006
 "Samson", by Godley & Creme from Birds of Prey, 1983
 "Samson", by V V Brown from Samson & Delilah, 2013

Companies 
 Samson AG
 Samson Ceramics, reproduction ceramics, 1845–1969
 Samson Tractor, a division of General Motors from 1917 to 1922, which also made trucks
 Samson, an Irish film production company, producers of Once
 Samson Technologies, a US-American audio equipment company; see Wireless microphone

People 
 Samson (name), a list of people with the given name or surname
 Samson (rapper) (1987–2020), English rapper and Cannabis activist
 Samson, English stage name of Santo (1917–1984), Mexican wrestler and film actor
 Samson, ring name of female Muay Thai boxing champion Siriporn Thaweesuk

Places 
 Samson, Isles of Scilly, United Kingdom
 Samson, Alabama, United States
 Sầm Sơn, Vietnam
 Samson, Western Australia, a suburb of Perth
 Samson, Doubs, France
 Samson Indian Reserve No. 137, Alberta, Canada

Military
 Samson Option, a deterrence strategy of massive retaliation with nuclear weapons, especially as applied to Israel
 Samson Unit, a special forces unit within the Israel Defense Forces (1988–1995)
 Samson Remote Controlled Weapon Station, an Israeli remote weapon system
 Lockheed Martin C-130J Super Hercules, a transport aircraft known as the "Samson" in Israeli service
 FV106 Samson, a British Army armoured recovery vehicle

Vehicles

Locomotives 
 Samson, an 1831 locomotive of the Liverpool & Manchester Railway
 Samson (locomotive), built in 1838, Canada's oldest locomotive
 Sampson (1855–1884), a South Devon Railway Tornado class steam locomotive
 Samson, an 1874 steam locomotive at Cornish Hush Mine

Other vehicles 
 Samson (crane barge), wrecked on the Irish coast in 1987
 La Mouette Samson, a French ultralight trike design
 City of New York (1885 ship), originally the Norwegian ship Samson

Other uses 
 SAMSON (Software for Adaptive Modeling and Simulation Of Nanosystems), a software platform for computational nanoscience
 Samson (dinosaur), a dinosaur skeleton with the most complete Tyrannosaurus rex skull ever found
 Samson (gorilla) (1949–1981), a male silverback western lowland gorilla
 Samson (magazine), a Japanese gay magazine featuring chubby and older men
 Samson fish, a jack of the genus Seriola
 Samson and Goliath (cranes), twin shipbuilding gantry cranes in Queen's Island, Belfast, Northern Ireland
 Samson Ultra, a trademark name for .50 Action Express preloaded handgun ammunition
 Samson, a name for the ND-5000 32-bit processor made by Norsk Data
 Samson, an alternative name for the wine grape Cinsaut
 "Samson", a 1988 art installation by Chris Burden

See also 
 Samson and Delilah (disambiguation)
 
 Sampson (disambiguation)
 Sansom, a surname
 Sanson (disambiguation)
 Samsun, Turkey
 Samsung, a South Korean multinational conglomerate